Donald James McKinnon (November 25, 1901 – August 11, 1976) was a provincial politician from Alberta, Canada. He served as a member of the Legislative Assembly of Alberta from 1940 to 1944, sitting as an Independent member from the constituency of Gleichen.

References

External links

1976 deaths
1901 births
Members of the Legislative Assembly of Alberta
20th-century Canadian politicians
People from Rocky View County
Independent Alberta MLAs